Sooraj R. Barjatya (born 22 February 1965) is an Indian film director, producer, screenwriter and distributor, predominantly working in Hindi cinema. Barjatya has directed and produced some of the  most commercially successful Indian films in Indian film history. His movies often include family drama and values as well as culturally influenced. Barjatya is the current chairman of the Indian media conglomerate Rajshri Productions. His films are produced under the Rajshri Productions banner, which was founded in 1947 by his late grandfather Tarachand Barjatya.

Barjatya began his career as an assistant director to Mahesh Bhatt. He made his directorial debut with blockbuster hit Maine Pyar Kiya (1989), a romantic musical film about friendship. He then wrote and directed one of India's biggest blockbuster ever, wedding celebration drama Hum Aapke Hain Koun..! (1994), which received widespread acclaim and became the most commercially successful Indian film of all time, sold over 7 crore tickets during its box office run, highest estimated admissions for any film in Hindi market since Sholay (1975). This was produced by his father Rajkumar Barjatya for Rajshri Productions. In 1999, Barjatya directed the commercially and critically successful film Hum Saath-Saath Hain, another biggest blockbuster of 90s. In 2006, Barjatya directed and produced Vivah, which established Shahid Kapoor as a leading actor in Bollywood. In 2015, the film Prem Ratan Dhan Payo, again written and directed by him with Salman Khan, his fourth collaboration with him, was one of the highest-grossing films of the year. His next directorial Uunchai based on friendship, starring Amitabh Bachchan in lead, released with positive reception in November 2022.

Sooraj Barjatya's movies had huge impact on society and pop culture as well. He is credited for bringing change in Hindi cinema in terms of making films without action and vulgarity. He inspired hugely successful filmmakers such as Aditya Chopra and Karan Johar to make films with cultural themes. His films such as Maine Pyar Kiya and Hum Aapke Hain Koun..!, Barjatya's two consecutive films, are still placed among the top ten most successful films of the last 80 years. Hum Sath Sath Hai was highest grossing film of 1999. and Vivah proved to be one of the biggest grossers of 2006, having celebrated a silver jubilee run at 25 centers across the country. The film was nominated for more than 15 awards.

Early life
Sooraj Barjatya was born in a Marwari Jain family in Mumbai. He attended St. Mary's School, Mumbai and The Scindia School in Gwalior. Encouraged by his paternal grandfather, Tarachand Barjatya, he directed his first film Maine Pyar Kiya for Rajshri at the young age of 24. He married Vineeta Barjatya in 1986 and the couple have three children.

Career
He made his directorial debut with Maine Pyar Kiya (1989) starring Salman Khan which was financially successful and launched both his and Salman's careers. The film also won him the Most Sensational Debut of the Year award. Bengali filmmaker Tarun Majumdar also adviced for Maine Pyer kiya. He teamed up with Salman again for Hum Aapke Hain Koun..! (1994) which became one of the highest-grossing films of all time and Hum Saath-Saath Hain: We Stand United which was huge commercial successful as well.

His fourth film was Main Prem Ki Diwani Hoon starring Hrithik Roshan, Kareena Kapoor and Abhishek Bachchan which was his first critical and commercial failure. His next film Vivah (2006) starring Shahid Kapoor and Amrita Rao proved to be one of the most successful films in his career. In all of Barjatya's films until Uunchai, the male protagonists are named 'Prem'. He had said in an interview that "Ours was a joint Marwari family and I grew up witnessing grand functions and wedding ceremonies in the family. The opulence shown in my films is based on my impressions as a child".

After 9 years of hiatus, he came back in direction again in 2015 with Prem Ratan Dhan Payo his 4th collaboration with Salman Khan, which was one of the highest grossing films of all time at that time earning almost ₹400cr worldwide. 

His next directorial Uunchai (2022) on friendship was released on 11th November starring Amitabh Bachchan, Anupam Kher and Boman Irani with Parineeti Chopra.

Filmography

References

External links

1965 births
Living people
20th-century Indian film directors
Indian male screenwriters
Hindi-language film directors
Filmfare Awards winners
Film producers from Mumbai
Hindi film producers
Barjatya family
21st-century Indian film directors
Film directors from Mumbai
Hindi screenwriters
Screenwriters from Maharashtra
Directors who won the Best Popular Film Providing Wholesome Entertainment National Film Award
Rajasthani people
Marwari people
21st-century Indian Jains
Screen Awards winners